Mysticum is a Norwegian industrial black metal band from Asker. They formed in 1992 under the name Sabazios, but changed shortly after with the demo release of "Medusa's Tears" in 1993. They are known as pioneers of the industrial black metal subgenre.

Line-up

Current 
 Preben "Prime Evil" Mulvik, also known as "Ravn" or "Svartravn" (Raven) - vocals, guitar
 Benny "Herr General Cerastes" Laumann - vocals, guitar, programming
 Robin "Dr. Best" Malmberg - bass guitar, programming

Past 
 Jan Axel "Hellhammer" Blomberg - drums (Never recorded. As stated by the band, computer-controlled drums is created with the sound to match their style. Hellhammer was just briefly in the band's line-up.)
 Ivar Bjørnson - guitars

Discography

References

External links
 
 Mysticum at Facebook
 Mysticum at MySpace

Norwegian black metal musical groups
Musical groups established in 1992
Musical groups from Akershus
Musicians from Asker